The 1988 IIHF European U18 Championship was the twenty-first playing of the IIHF European Junior Championships.

Group A
Played April 9–17, 1988, in Frýdek-Místek, Vsetín, Olomouc, and Prerov, Czechoslovakia.

First round
Group 1
Played in Olomouc and Prerov.

Group 2
Played in Frýdek-Místek and Vsetín

Final round 
Championship round
Played in Frýdek-Místek, Vsetín, Olomouc, and Prerov.

7th place

Poland was relegated to Group B for 1989.

Tournament Awards
Top Scorer  Teemu Selänne (16 points)
Top Goalie: Henry Eskelinen
Top Defenceman:Sergei Zubov
Top Forward: Petri Aaltonen

Group B
Played March 26 to April 1, 1988, in Briançon France

First round
Group 1

Group 2

Final round 
Championship round

Placing round

West Germany was promoted to Group A and Great Britain was relegated to Group C, for 1989.

Group C
Played April 6–9, 1988, in San Sebastián Spain

Bulgaria was promoted to Group B for 1989.

References

Complete results

Junior
IIHF European Junior Championship tournament
April 1988 sports events in Europe
International ice hockey competitions hosted by Czechoslovakia
Sport in Olomouc
Sport in Frýdek-Místek
Junior
March 1988 sports events in Europe
International ice hockey competitions hosted by France
Junior
International ice hockey competitions hosted by Spain
Sport in San Sebastián
1987–88 in Spanish ice hockey